Emerald Hill Cricket Ground (also known as the Melbourne Cricket Club Ground and South Yarra Ground) was a cricket ground in Melbourne, Victoria, Australia.  The ground held the second ever first-class match to be played in Australia when Victoria played Tasmania in March 1852.  The match was won by Victoria by 61 runs.  The last recorded match came on 5 January 1888 when Yarra Bend played GF Vernon's XI.

See also
 List of cricket grounds in Australia

References

External links
Emerald Hill Cricket Ground at ESPNcricinfo
Emerald Hill Cricket Ground at CricketArchive

Defunct cricket grounds in Australia
Sports venues in Melbourne
Sports venues completed in 1852
1852 establishments in Australia
Demolished buildings and structures in Melbourne